{{Automatic taxobox
|fossil_range =
|image = Rubidgea head12DB.jpg
|image_caption = Visualized head of Rubidgea atrox
|taxon = Rubidgeinae
|authority = Broom, 1938
|subdivision_ranks = Genera
|subdivision =
Aelurognathus
Sycosaurus
Ruhuhucerberus
Rubidgeini
Clelandina
Dinogorgon
Leontosaurus
Rubidgea
}}Rubidgeinae' is an extinct subfamily of gorgonopsid therapsids known only from Africa. They were among the largest gorgonopsians, and their fossils are common in the Cistecephalus and Daptocephalus assemblage zones of the Karoo Basin. They lived during the Late Permian, and became extinct at the end of the Permian.

Description
Rubidgeines were large, quadrupedal carnivores of the family Gorgonopsidae. Their largest teeth are their upper canines, which were blade-like and had well-developed serrations. Their postcanine teeth were small and conical, but were also frequently serrated. Tooth replacement was rapid relative to basal therocephalians. Rubidgeines can be distinguished from other gorgonopsians by the absence of a blade-like parasphenoid bone and reduced or absent preparietal bone. The jugal bone, while narrow in most gorgonopsians, was often broadly expanded in rubidgeines. The largest rubidgeins were Dinogorgon and Rubidgea''.

Paleobiology
 
Rubidgeines were among the largest gorgonopsians known, and the largest known from Africa. They were also the largest predators in their environment. Their massive canines and serrated teeth indicate that they were adapted for macropredation.

The robust skull roof and supraorbital bosses of rubidgeines likely acted to protect the skull from the stress inflicted during prey capture, and similar morphology has been seen in many other macropredators in the fossil record, including theropod dinosaurs. The presence of this skull morphology is one of multiple adaptations seen in predators that utilize the skull, rather than the limbs, in prey capture.

Classification and systematics
Below is a cladogram by Kammerer in 2016.

References

Gorgonopsia
Permian extinctions
Prehistoric animal subfamilies
Therapsid subfamilies